The International Coaching Federation (ICF) is a non-profit organization dedicated to professional coaching. ICF defines coaching as partnering with clients in a thought-provoking and creative process that inspires them to maximize their personal and professional potential. ICF is an accrediting and credentialing body for both training programs and coaches.

Overview 
ICF serves more than 50,000 members in more than 150 countries and territories around the world as of January 2022, with 143 chapters serving local members in more than 80 countries and territories. As of March 2021, there were over 33,000 certified coaches who hold one of three ICF credentials: 18,628 Associate Certified Coaches (ACC); 13,332 Professional Certified Coaches (PCC); and 1,327 Master Certified Coaches (MCC). 

ICF's services include establishing a professional code of ethics and standards, providing continuous education and networking opportunities in local chapters, hosting conferences and Communities of Practice, providing accreditation for coach-specific training programs, and administering an internationally recognized credentialing program.

History 
Founded in 1995, ICF campaigns worldwide for professional standards within the coaching profession, and provides independent certification for professional coaches (through three ICF credentials) and coach training programs (through ICF Training Program Accreditation).

In 2011, the ICF and the European Mentoring and Coaching Council (EMCC) led in the lodging with the European Union a charter which lays out how the coaching and mentoring profession across Europe can remain a self-regulated profession.

Credentialing 
ICF offers three credentials: Associate, Professional and Master Certified Coach.

Associate Certified Coach (ACC) 

 Requires 60+ hours of training, and 100+ hours of coaching experience
 Performance evaluation (audio recording and written transcript of a coaching session)
 Completion of the Coach Knowledge Assessment (CKA)*

Professional Certified Coach (PCC) 

 Requires 125+ hours of training, and 500+ hours of coaching experience

 Performance evaluation (two audio recordings and written transcripts of coaching sessions)
 Completion of the Coach Knowledge Assessment (CKA)*

Master Certified Coach (MCC) 

 Requires 250+ hours of training, and 2,500+ hours of coaching experience

 Performance evaluation (two audio recordings and written transcripts of coaching sessions)
 Currently holds (or previously held) a Professional Certified Coach (PCC) Credential
 Completion of the Coach Knowledge Assessment (CKA)*

*The Coach Knowledge Assessment (CKA) will be replaced by the ICF Credentialing Exam in the second quarter of 2022.

References 

Professional associations based in the United States
Organizations established in 1995
1995 establishments in the United States
International nongovernmental organizations